Alan G. McHughen (born 13 April 1954) is a Canadian-American molecular biologist known for his scholarship in DNA technologies and work developing United States and Canadian regulations governing the safety of genetically engineered crops and foods.

Early life and education

 Dalhousie University, B.Sc. Biology/Biochemistry 1976
 Oxford University, D.Phil., Developmental Botany, 1979
 Yale University, Postdoctoral Fellow 1979-1982

Career and research

McHughen served as an Assistant then full Professor and Research Scientist with the University of Saskatchewan from 1982 to 2002. He currently leads the McHughen Research Group at the University of California, Riverside in the Department of Botany and Plant Sciences.

From 2011 to 2012 McHughen served as a Jefferson Science Fellow and Senior Policy Analyst in the Executive Office of the President in the Obama Administration.

McHughen is a past-President of the International Society for Biosafety Research, a fellow with the American College of Nutrition (2002), a AAAS Fellow with the American Association for the Advancement of Science (2010), and member of the American Society of Plant Biology.

Awards and honors

McHughen received the Robert Anderson Fellowship in Biochemistry from Yale University and a research fellowship from the Royal Commission for the Exhibition of 1851. He also received the Science in Society Book of the Year Award in 2000  from the Science Writers & Communicators of Canada, the Certificate of Merit from the U.S. Department of Agriculture in 2006,  and the Distinguished Lecturer Award from the U.S. Environmental Protection Agency in 2001.

Publications

McHugen is the author of numerous peer reviewed research articles, academic papers, and contributor to text books on the issue of genetically modified crops.  Significant authored books include:

External links
 McHugen Research Group

References

American botanists
20th-century American biologists
21st-century American biologists
20th-century American botanists
21st-century American botanists
Fellows of the American Association for the Advancement of Science
Alumni of the University of Oxford
1954 births
Living people